109 Piscium b (aka HD 10697 b) is a long-period extrasolar planet discovered in orbit around 109 Piscium. It is about 5.74 times the mass of Jupiter and is likely to be a gas giant. As is common for long-period planets discovered around other stars, it has an orbital eccentricity greater than that of Jupiter.

Preliminary astrometric measurements suggested that the orbital inclination is 170.3°, yielding an object mass of 38 times that of Jupiter, which would make it a brown dwarf. However, subsequent analysis indicates that the precision of the measurements used to derive the astrometric orbit is insufficient to constrain the parameters. A more plausible suggestion is that this planet shares its star's inclination, of 69°. In 2022, the inclination and true mass of 109 Piscium b were measured via astrometry. The inclination estimate is consistent with that of the stellar rotation.

See also
54 Piscium b – another nearby planet in the constellation of Pisces

References

109 Piscium
Giant planets
Exoplanets discovered in 1999
Exoplanets detected by radial velocity
Exoplanets detected by astrometry
Giant planets in the habitable zone